Siku Ya Bibi (Day of the Lady) is an album by saxophonist Charles McPherson, dedicated to Billie Holiday, which was recorded in 1972 and released on the Mainstream label.

Reception

The AllMusic review awarded the album 4 stars stating "Although not quite up to the level of his upcoming, more freewheeling Xanadu sessions, this is a fine outing".

Track listing 
 "Don't Explain" (Billie Holiday, Arthur Herzog, Jr.) - 4:22   
 "Lover Man (Oh, Where Can You Be?)" (Jimmy Davis, Ram Ramirez) - 4:52  
 "God Bless the Child" (Holiday, Herzog)  4:24  
 "Miss Brown to You" (Richard A. Whiting, Ralph Rainger, Leo Robin) - 4:38   
 "Good Morning Heartache" (Ervin Drake, Dan Fisher, Irene Higginbotham) - 4:24     
 "For Heaven's Sake" (Elise Bretton, Sherman Edwards, Donald Meyer) - 4:57     
 "I'm a Fool to Want You" (Frank Sinatra, Jack Wolf, Joel Herron) - 4:37
 "Lover, Come Back to Me" (Sigmund Romberg, Oscar Hammerstein II) - 6:56

Personnel 
Charles McPherson - alto saxophone
Ted Dunbar - guitar (tracks 1, 3, 5 & 7)
Barry Harris - piano
Sam Jones - bass
Leroy Williams - drums
Selwart Clarke, Max Ellen, Emanuel Green, Joe Malin, David Nadien, Gene Orloff - violin (tracks 1, 3, 5 & 7)
Julien Barber, Alfred Brown - viola (tracks 1, 3, 5 & 7)
 Kermit Moore, Alan Shulman - cello (tracks 1, 3, 5 & 7)
Ernie Wilkins - conductor, arranger (tracks 1, 3, 5 & 7)

References 

Charles McPherson (musician) albums
1972 albums
Mainstream Records albums
Albums produced by Bob Shad